= Globetrooper =

- Developers: Todd Sullivan & Lauren McLeod
- Release: 2010; 16 years ago
- Type: Travel
- Website: globetrooper.com

Globetrooper is a free travel app known for assisting travelers in finding partners for group trips and world adventures.

Globetrooper offers a free social travel platform that helps people find travel partners.

== History ==
Globetrooper was developed and released in 2010 by a couple; Todd Sullivan and Lauren McLeod who are two travel-minded individuals that wanted to make it easier for travelers to plan a journey and see the world. With their backgrounds in business, software & design, and a love for travel, both left the corporate world and launched Globetrooper on Lauren’s birthday 28 March 2010.

Globetrooper was first launched as an information portal with a view to making it more social, but after some months, the content quickly grew and changed to the ‘travel partner’ concept.
